Ahmed Dini Ahmed (1932 – 12 September 2004) was a Djiboutian politician.  He was trained as a health technician and entered the political realm at age 26. He served as Vice-president of the Representative Council of French Somaliland from April 1959 to June 1960, he was a member of the government of Ali Aref Bourhan in 1962–1964, he then participated in the foundation of the Afar Democratic Union (UDA). He is Minister of Home Affairs until 1971. In 1975, he became spokesman for the new African People's League for Independence (LPAI), led by Hassan Gouled Aptidon and was later Prime Minister of Djibouti from 1977 to 1978. In July 1977, he became Prime Minister of the new Republic of Djibouti. In December, after the bombing of the Palm in Zinc, and the consequent ban on the Movement for the Liberation (MPL), he resigned and returned to the opposition. He led the Front for the Restoration of Unity and Democracy (FRUD), an Afar rebel group, during the civil war of the 1990s; after the group split in 1994, he led a radical faction of FRUD.

Biography
Ahmed, a member of the Afar ethnic group, was born near Mount Mabla in the northern Djibouti. Following independence, Ahmed became Prime Minister as well Minister in charge of Urban and Regional Planning (Aménagement du territoire) and the Creation of New Resources in July 1977. He resigned from the position six months later after clashing with President Hassan Gouled Aptidon.

Later years
He led FRUD in its armed struggle against the government, which began in 1991. He led the movement that engaged in a desert war against Issa domination which surfaced soon after independence was established. FRUD split in 1994, and a moderate faction led by Ali Mohamed Daoud entered negotiations with the government (signing a peace agreement in December 1994), while Ahmed continued to lead a radical faction which vowed to continue to fight. The radical faction held a congress in late September 1994 and elected Dini as head of its executive committee. Following the signing of a reconciliation agreement between his faction and the government in February 2000, Dini returned to Djibouti from Yemen on 29 March 2000, ending nine years of exile.

In the January 2003 parliamentary election, he was the first candidate on the candidate list of the opposition coalition, the Union for a Democratic Alternative (UAD), in the District of Djibouti; however, the coalition did not win any seats.

He died on 12 September 2004 at a French military hospital in Djibouti.

References

1932 births
2004 deaths
Prime Ministers of Djibouti
Djiboutian rebels
Djiboutian democracy activists
Front for the Restoration of Unity and Democracy politicians
People from Obock Region
Afar people
Deaths in Djibouti